The 1898 Oklahoma Sooners football team represented the University of Oklahoma as an independent during the 1898 college football season. In their fourth year of football, and second year under head coach Vernon Louis Parrington, the Sooners compiled a 2–0 record, and outscored their opponents by a combined total of 29 to 0. This was the first season in which the team competed outside Oklahoma Territory, playing a road game against an Arkansas City, Kansas town team.

Schedule

References

Oklahoma
Oklahoma Sooners football seasons
College football undefeated seasons
Oklahoma Sooners football